The 2017 Philippine Basketball Association (PBA) Commissioner's  Cup Finals was the best-of-7 championship series of the 2017 PBA Commissioner's Cup and the conclusion of the conference's playoffs. The San Miguel Beermen and the TNT KaTropa competed for the 17th Commissioner's Cup championship and the 120th overall championship contested by the league.

Background

Road to the finals

Head-to-head matchup

Series summary

Game summaries

Game 1

Game 2

Game 3

Game 4

Game 5

Game 6

Rosters

{| class="toccolours" style="font-size: 95%; width: 100%;"
|-
! colspan="2" style="background-color: #; color: #; text-align: center;" | San Miguel Beermen 2017 PBA Commissioner's Cup roster
|- style="background-color:#; color: #; text-align: center;"
! Players !! Coaches
|-
| valign="top" |
{| class="sortable" style="background:transparent; margin:0px; width:100%;"
! Pos. !! # !! POB !! Name !! Height !! Weight !! DOB (YYYY–MM–DD) !! College
|-

 

{| class="toccolours" style="font-size: 95%; width: 100%;"
|-
! colspan="2" style="background-color: #; color: #; text-align: center;" | TNT KaTropa 2017 PBA Commissioner's Cup roster
|- style="background-color:#; color: #; text-align: center;"
! Players !! Coaches
|-
| valign="top" |
{| class="sortable" style="background:transparent; margin:0px; width:100%;"
! Pos. !! # !! POB !! Name !! Height !! Weight !! DOB (YYYY–MM–DD) !! College
|-

Broadcast notes
The Philippine Cup Finals was aired on TV5 with simulcasts on PBA Rush (both in standard and high definition). TV5's radio arm, Radyo5 provided the radio play-by-play coverage. 

Sports5 also provided online livestreaming via their official YouTube account using the TV5 feed.

The PBA Rush broadcast provided English-language coverage of the Finals.

Additional Game 6 crew:
Trophy presentation: James Velasquez
Dugout celebration interviewer: Sel Guevara

References

External links
PBA official website

2017
2016–17 PBA season
San Miguel Beermen games
TNT Tropang Giga games
PBA Commissioner's Cup Finals
PBA Commissioner's Cup Finals